The 18th century in the United States refers to the period in the United States from 1701 through 1800 in the Gregorian calendar.  For articles on this period, see:

 History of the United States series:
 Colonial history of the United States
 History of the United States (1776–1789)
 History of the United States (1789–1849)
 Historical eras:
 American Revolution
 Confederation period
 Federalist Era